Mount Greenock is a  mountain summit located in the Athabasca River valley of Jasper National Park in Alberta, Canada. It is situated in the De Smet Range of the Canadian Rockies. It was named in 1916 by Morrison P. Bridgland after Greenock, in Scotland. Bridgland (1878-1948) was a Dominion Land Surveyor who named many peaks in Jasper Park and the Canadian Rockies. The mountain's name was officially adopted in 1956 by the Geographical Names Board of Canada.

Climate
Based on the Köppen climate classification, Mount Greenock is located in a subarctic climate with cold, snowy winters, and mild summers.

See also
 Geology of the Rocky Mountains

References

Mountains of Jasper National Park
Canadian Rockies
Two-thousanders of Alberta